Hoani Tui (born 29 May 1984) is a New Zealand rugby union player. He currently plays for Oyonnax in the Pro D2. His position of choice is prop.

When playing for Wellington, Hoani was called up to represent the New Zealand Māori side in the 2007 Churchill Cup. Tui signed for the Italian side Calvisano in 2008, Tui then joined the Exeter Chiefs for the 2009/2010 season.

Having made a total of 120 appearances for Exeter, it was announced on 8 January 2013 that Tui had signed for Lyon.

References

External links
Exeter Player Profile
Aviva Premiership Player Profile

New Zealand rugby union players
1984 births
Living people
Exeter Chiefs players
Rugby union props
Wellington rugby union players
Rugby Calvisano players
Lyon OU players
Oyonnax Rugby players
Māori All Blacks players
Rugby union players from Whanganui